Philippe "Nic" vande Walle (born 22 December 1961) is a former Belgian football goalkeeper.  His former clubs include FC Bruges, K.F.C. Germinal Ekeren, K.S.K. Lierse and Eendracht Aalst.  Vande Walle was part of the Belgium national team for the 1998 World Cup.

Honours
Germinal Ekeren
 Belgian Cup: 1996–97

Lierse SK
 Belgian Super Cup: 1997

References

External links

1961 births
Living people
Belgian footballers
Belgium international footballers
Association football goalkeepers
Lierse S.K. players
R. Charleroi S.C. players
Club Brugge KV players
Beerschot A.C. players
S.C. Eendracht Aalst players
1998 FIFA World Cup players
Belgian Pro League players
Belgian football managers
R. Charleroi S.C. managers